The Agee House in Birmingham, Alabama, at 1804 Twelfth Ave. S., was built around 1900.  It was listed on the National Register of Historic Places in 1986.

It is significant as the "only existing example of fully-developed Shingle style architecture in Birmingham": "The house features important features identified with the style such as an overall free form entirely covered with textured shingles, a hipped roof with multi-cross hipped dormers, a half round two-story bay with a roof which blends into the volume of the main house roofline, banded windows and wrap-around porches. Dissemination of the academic Shingle style across America during the late 19th century was widespread but never highly popular, and it is especially rare in Alabama."

The house's wide eaves seems to evoke the later Prairie Style, and the repeated curves presages the later Streamline Moderne style.

References

		
National Register of Historic Places in Jefferson County, Alabama
Shingle Style architecture in Alabama
Houses completed in 1900